The Tie That Binds may refer to:

 "Blessed Be the Tie that Binds", a hymn by John Fawcett
 The Tie That Binds (novel), a 1984 novel by Kent Haruf
 The Tie That Binds (1995 film), a 1995 thriller by Wesley Strick
 The Tie That Binds (1923 film), a 1923 American silent drama film